Mehdiabad (also Romanized as Mehdīābād, Mekhdiabad, and Mihdiābād) is a village in Qaqazan-e Sharqi Rural District, in the Central District of Takestan County, Qazvin Province, Iran. At the 2006 census, its population was 758, in 157 families.

References 

Populated places in Takestan County